Declan Browne (born 16 June 1978) is an Irish Gaelic football coach and player who competed at inter-county level for Tipperary for 11 years. He currently plays his club football for Moyle Rovers. He represented Ireland against Australia in the 2003 and 2004 International Rules series.

Playing career
Browne made his championship debut in 1996 in a Munster championship game against Kerry. Browne received Tipperary's first football All-Star in 1998 when he was picked at corner-forward after leading the Tipperary team to the Munster Football Final. Browne won his second All-Star award in 2003. He has won seven Tipperary Senior Football Championship medals with his club, Moyle Rovers. He won a Munster Minor Football Championship medal in 1995, a Munster and All Ireland Minor Hurling medal in 1996 and a Munster U-21 Hurling medal in 1999 as well as a McGrath Cup medal in 2003 and was awarded the Munster footballer of the year award for that same year. He also won 2 Fitzgibbon Cup medals. Browne captained Tipperary to win the 2005 Tommy Murphy Cup.  In 2007, he announced his retirement from the inter-county scene, following Tipperary's defeat by Clare in the Tommy Murphy Cup.

Management
Browne took over as the manager of the Tipperary Under-21 Football team in September 2016.
His first game in charge was against Limerick on 8 March 2017 in the Munster Under-21 Football Championship which Tipperary lost 0–14 to 0–16.

In January 2021, Browne joined the Tipperary senior football management team as the forwards coach.

Career Statistics

Honours

Moyle Rovers
 7 Tipperary Senior Football Championship 1995 1996 1998 1999 2000 2007 2009
 2 Tipperary Junior Hurling Championship 1998 2007

Tipperary
 1 Munster Junior Club Hurling Championship 
 1 Munster Minor Hurling Championship 1996 
 1 All-Ireland Minor Hurling Championship 1996
 1 Munster Minor Football Championship 1995
 1 McGrath Cup 2003
 1 Munster Intermediate Hurling Championship 2000
 1 All-Ireland Intermediate Hurling Championship 2000
 1 Tommy Murphy Cup 2005
 1 Munster Under-21 Hurling Championship 1999

Waterford Institute of Technology
 2 Fitzgibbon Cup 1999 2000

Munster
 1 Railway Cup 1999

Individual
 2 All Stars Awards 1998 2003

References

1978 births
Living people
Dual players
Gaelic football coaches
Gaelic football managers
Moyle Rovers Gaelic footballers
Moyle Rovers hurlers
Tipperary inter-county Gaelic footballers
Tipperary inter-county hurlers